Perittodus is an extinct genus of four-limbed stem-tetrapod from the Mississippian (mid-Tournaisian) of Scotland. It contains a single species, Perittodus apsconditus, based on disarticulated skull and postcranial bones from the Ballagan Formation. The lower jaw of the holotype specimen was about 6.8 cm (2.7 in.) in length and had a pattern of dentition similar to the Devonian taxon Ymeria. Perittodus was described in a 2016 study which was devised to fill in the tetrapod and stem-tetrapod faunas of Romer's gap, an interval of the early Carboniferous with few vertebrate fossils. It was one of five new genera named in this study, along with Aytonerpeton, Diploradus, Koilops, and Ossirarus.

References 

Carboniferous tetrapods of Europe
Stegocephalians
Mississippian animals
Prehistoric tetrapod genera
Fossil taxa described in 2016
Taxa named by Jenny Clack